Günther Rieger (born 4 March 1939) is an Austrian cross-country skier. He competed in the men's 15 kilometre event at the 1964 Winter Olympics.

References

1939 births
Living people
Austrian male cross-country skiers
Olympic cross-country skiers of Austria
Cross-country skiers at the 1964 Winter Olympics
Place of birth missing (living people)
20th-century Austrian people